The 1901 Cumberland Bulldogs football team represented Cumberland University in the 1901 Southern Intercollegiate Athletic Association football season. The team was a member of the Southern Intercollegiate Athletic Association (SIAA). Nearly the whole backfield was injured against Mooney.

Schedule

References

Cumberland
Cumberland Phoenix football seasons
Cumberland Bulldogs football